Martin Middlebrook  (born 1932) is an English military historian and author.

Education and military service
Middlebrook was educated at various schools, including Ratcliffe College, Leicester. He entered National Service in 1950, was commissioned in the Royal Army Service Corps (RASC), and served as a Motor Transport Officer in the Suez Canal Zone and Aqaba, Jordan. Middlebrook subsequently spent three years in Territorial Army service.

Career
Middlebrook wrote his first book The First Day on the Somme (1971) following a visit to the First World War battlefields of France and Belgium in 1967. The book is a detailed study of the single worst day for the British Army.  Middlebrook gave the same single-day treatment to 21 March 1918, the opening of the German spring offensive, in The Kaiser's Battle. Middlebrook's Second World War books concentrate on the air war.  A number of them again deal with a single day of action (The Nuremberg Raid, The Schweinfurt–Regensburg Mission and The Peenemünde Raid) while others cover longer air battles (The Battle of Hamburg and The Berlin Raids). Middlebrook has also written two books on the Falklands War, one from the British and Falkland Islanders' perspective and one from the Argentinian perspective.

Honours
Middlebrook is a Fellow of the Royal Historical Society (FRHistS). He was appointed Knight of the Order of the Belgian Crown in 2004.

Books 

The First Day on the Somme with much co-operation from John Howlett. (1971) 
The Nuremberg Raid (1973) 
Battleship: the loss of the Prince of Wales and the Repulse (with Patrick Mahoney) (1977)  
The Kaiser's Battle with much co-operation from Neville Mackinder. (1978) 
The Battle of Hamburg (1980)
The Peenemünde Raid (1982)
The Schweinfurt-Regensburg Mission (1983)
The Falklands War, 1982 (1985) first published as Operation Corporate
The Berlin Raids (1988)
Convoy SC.122 & HX.229 (1976) 
The Bomber Command War Diaries (1985) (with the late Chris Everitt) 
The Somme Battlefields: a Comprehensive Guide from Crʹecy to the Two World Wars (with his wife Mary Middlebrook) (1991) 
Arnhem 1944 (1994) 
Your Country Needs You: from Six to Sixty-five Divisions (2000) 

The North Midlands Territorials Go To War/Captain Staniland's Journey

References

External links
 A letter from Middlebrook describing the writing of The First Day on the Somme

Fellows of the Royal Historical Society
Historians of World War I
British military writers
Living people
1932 births
British military historians

Knights of the Order of the Crown (Belgium)
Historians of World War II
Royal Army Service Corps officers
Military personnel from Lincolnshire